This is a list of flags used by the Democratic Republic of the Congo and its antecedents.

National

Standards

Sub-national

Political flags

Rebel groups

Ethnic groups flags

Historical

Flag Proposal

Democratic Republic of Congo
Democratic Republic of the Congo-related lists
Flags